Arosa railway station is a railway station on the Chur–Arosa railway (the "Arosabahn") of the Rhaetian Railway (RhB). It is situated in the town and resort of Arosa, close by to the Obersee (one of the lakes in the vicinity).

The station is the upper terminus of the line and has a number of passenger facilities including a ticket office, shop, and cafe.

A 299m long tunnel takes the line under part of Arosa as it ascends to the station. There is a large yard of freight/rolling stock sidings just beyond the station at the very end of the line, as well as a 2-road locomotive shed (essentially for shunters) at the lower end.

Weisshorn cable car
The base station of the cable car up the Aroser Weisshorn is situated very near to the station. Cable cars arrive/depart every 20 minutes during daytime for much of the year.

Services
The following services stop at Arosa:

Gallery

References

External links
 
 
 
 Arosa cable cars
 Webcam overlooking the Arosa station platforms

Railway stations in Switzerland opened in 1914
Railway stations in Graubünden
Rhaetian Railway stations
Arosa